Michael Paul Mason (born November 21, 1958) is a retired Major League Baseball player who played pitcher from – for the Texas Rangers, Chicago Cubs, and Minnesota Twins.  He is currently the pitching coach for the Iowa Cubs. His best season came as a member of the 1984 Texas Rangers.

External links

1958 births
Major League Baseball pitchers
Baseball players from Minnesota
Texas Rangers players
Chicago Cubs players
Minnesota Twins players
Living people
Gulf Coast Rangers players
Asheville Tourists players
Tulsa Drillers players
Oklahoma City 89ers players
Iowa Cubs players
Portland Beavers players
Memphis Chicks players
Green Bay Sultans players